World Pump Festival, better known as World Pump It Up Festival or WPF, is a competition and event focusing on the dance game Pump It Up which takes place in various time slots.  Pump It Up is a Korean game that requires physical movement of the feet. The game is open for breakdancing, and many people have accomplished this feat by memorizing the steps and creating dance moves to hit the arrows on time. What separates this from other Machine dance tournaments is the large amount of prize money on offer and national qualifiers around the world.

At WPF, the best technical and freestyle players are flown from several countries to compete in their respective categories: Speed and Freestyle. As of 2006, a Female Speed category was introduced. The candidates are selected by tournaments held in their respective country by Supporters and Club Leaders - Members of the Pump community who work unpaid for Andamiro, organise tournaments and social events during the year. As well as the competition itself, Andamiro takes players and spectators on a tour of the host country, as a form of tourism aiming to promote the game as a sport for weight loss using videogames and Korean culture to create friendship between players. Previous locations of WPF have been held in Korea at G Star, Lotte World and more recently, Mexico City. Nationals (qualifiers for WPF) in Mexico and Brazil have been held in sports stadiums.

Competitors in the freestyle category incorporate elements of locking, salsa, funk styles, popping, hip hop dance, breakdance, street dance and other types of dance and theatrical movements into performances. It has become the norm to make a routine using choreography while facing the audience.

Andamiro provides a round trip flight, hotel, meals, transportation and tour at WPF for national winners. Spectators wishing to travel also have accommodation and most expenses covered.

Tournament categories

NOTE: Players can ONLY compete in 1 division!

Speed
Players will achieve the highest score possible. Technical players focus on timing and pattern reading during gameplay, while minimizing combo breaking because combo breaking will disrupt the multiplier. Speed entrants (both in the male and female category) will practice the game on the most difficult songs/highest difficulty levels in an attempt to perfect their scores. The following rounds are as follows:

Freestyle
Pump players will choose to incorporate complex or flashy techniques into their play movements, and develop intricate dance routines to perform during a song. Freestyle players tend to choose songs on lower difficulty levels or Freestyle-based Performance Charts designed for it, so that the player is not restricted in their movements by large quantities of required steps. Freesylers can choose between performing solo or have a partner involved. This category contains 2 rounds: Preliminary and final (Top 8 or Top 4). The scorecard are as follows:

Supporters and clubs
A Supporter is a person who is the main point of contact between their respective country and Andamiro Korea. Any events and tournaments held require a written report with photos/videos sent to Andamiro, in exchange for prizes and recognition of athletes to enter WPF. A Club Leader is the person in charge of their respective club and should use their best efforts to maintain a close relationship with their Supporter. Clubs are normally (but not exclusively) town specific and focus on events in their area. As of 2007 a minimum of 10 officially recognised clubs are required per country to validate them for WPF (150 club members). Excellent club organisers can be designated as jurors in competitions for selecting national team members and also the WPF competition itself. If this is the case, Andamiro pays for all WPF jurors expenses, like WPF athletes. Andamiro gives prize money two times a year to the club's treasurer for club activities. Members who make a forum post, upload a picture/video or high score for the home/arcade versions of the game receive points. These can be exchanged in the online store for T-shirts, Sweatbands, Visors, CD's/DVD's and signed MP3 players by Banya (musical group).

History

World Pump Festival 2005
This was the first year Andamiro hosted its first-ever World Pump Festival. This was hosted in Korea. The primary machine used for this was Pump It Up Exceed 2. The total prize offered was $129,000.

World Pump Festival 2006
World Pump Festival returns to Korea. The primary machine used for this was Pump It Up Zero. Female Speed was introduced to the competition, while removing Battle Station as part of their lineup. The total prize offered was $146,000.

World Pump Festival 2007
The biggest change with World Pump Festival was the move to Mexico. The primary machine used for this was Pump It Up NX. The total prize offered was $148,000. This is the last World Pump Festival to consistently be annual as the next one wasn't until 2011.

World Pump Festival 2011
After a long 3 year Hiatus, in 2010 Andamiro began hinting at WPF 2011, with the new release of "PIU Fiesta EX". Fiesta EX is the official version used in WPF 2011 and used a "Random for WPF" channel ver.  WPF2011 was held in China, August 25–27, 2011 / GTI Game Show in Guangzhou.

The biggest change in this event was allowing the use of the bar for all divisions, primarily Male Speed. Previously, bar was prohibited until this event, drastically changing the landscape of the competition. Because Fiesta removed the traditional difficulties (Crazy and Nightmare), they are replaced with actual difficulty numbers, making navigation easier (See Speed above).

World Pump Festival 2016
Upon the release of Pump It Up Prime, World Pump Festival was announced both in the pamphlet and credits in the machine. The year of the festival was changed from 2015 to 2016.

On February 23, Andamiro released the official ruleset for the upcoming WPF.

A video on April 18, 2016, confirmed that World Pump Festival will take place at Bali, Indonesia on July 23, 2016.

Andamiro has released full details of WPF 2016:
 Host Country: Indonesia
 Place of competition: LIPPO MALL Kuta, Denpasar Bali
 Date: July 24, 2016
 Category: Speed (Male and Female), Freestyle
 Total prize: USD $18,000
 Accommodation: Aston Hotel Kuta

Announced at this WPF was Pump It Up PRIME 2, scheduled for a November 2016 release.

Results

2016 Finals Details 
Results:

4th Place and everything else TBA.

Entries List:

Note: All sections listed as "N/A" did not meet minimum requirements to qualify for WPF or did not manage to travel for WPF.

2011 Results

2007 Results

2006 Results

2005 Results

See also
Street dance
Breakdance
Exergaming
Music video game

References and notes

External links

Notice for WPF 2007
Andamiro website
PIU Club website
Pump It Up official website

Arcade video games
Breakdance
Pump It Up (video game series) competitions
Street dance
Entertainment events in South Korea
Fitness games
Recurring sporting events established in 2005
2005 establishments in South Korea